Sonderdienst were the Nazi German paramilitary formations created in semicolonial General Government during the occupation of Poland in World War II. They were based on similar SS formations called Volksdeutscher Selbstschutz operating in the Warthegau district of German-annexed western part of Poland in 1939.

Sonderdienst were founded on 6 May 1940 by Gauleiter Hans Frank who stationed in occupied Kraków. Initially, they were made up of ethnic German Volksdeutsche who lived in Poland before the attack and joined the invading force thereafter. After Operation Barbarossa began in 1941, they also included Soviet prisoners of war who volunteered for special training, such as the Trawniki men (German: Trawnikimänner) deployed at all major killing sites of the "Final Solution". Many of those men did not know German and required translation by their native commanders. The Abteilung Sonderdienst (Department of Special Services) was subordinate to Oberkommando der Wehrmacht sabotage division under Colonel Erwin von Lahousen (1 September 1939 – July 1943), and Colonel Wessel Freytag von Loringhoven (July 1943 – June 1944).

Background

The Republic of Poland was a multicultural country before World War II, with almost a third of its population originating from the minority groups: 13.9% Ukrainians; 10% Jews; 3.1% Belarusians; 2.3% Germans and 3.4% Czechs, Lithuanians and Russians. Members of the German minority resided predominantly in the lands of the former German Empire but not only. Many were hostile towards the existence of the Polish state after losing their colonial privileges at the end of World War I. German organizations in Poland such as Deutscher Volksverband and the Jungdeutsche Partei actively engaged in espionage for the Abwehr, sabotage actions, weapons-smuggling and Nazi propaganda campaigns before the invasion. In late 1939 through spring of 1940 the German Volksdeutscher Selbstschutz took active part in the massacres of civilian Poles and Jews.

In the summer of 1940, the Sonderdienst along with all Selbstschutz executioners were formally assigned to the head of the civil administration for the newly formed Gau. Trained by the native Germans under the leadership of Heinrich Himmler's associate Ludolf Jakob von Alvensleben many of them joined Schutzstaffel or Gestapo in the following year.

Operation Barbarossa

Some 3,000 men served with the Sonderdienst in the General Government. After the German conquest of eastern Europe, known as Operation Barbarossa, Gruppenführer Globocnik eagerly sought another source of manpower. The citizens of these countries who spoke German became highly valued because of their ability to communicate in Ukrainian, Russian, Polish and other languages of the occupied territories. The training of non-Polish auxiliaries was arranged at Trawniki by SS-Hauptsturmführer Karl Streibel. Instructed by Globocnik to start recruiting behind the front lines of Operation Barbarossa, Streibel trained 5,082 mostly Ukrainian guards before the end of 1944. They were organized into two new Sonderdienst battalions. According to the postwar testimony of SS-Oberführer Arpad Wigand during his war crimes trial in Hamburg, only 25 percent of them spoke German.

The Hiwi Wachmänner guards known as "Trawniki men" (Trawnikimänner) served at death camps as well as all major killing sites of the "Final Solution" in the course of Operation Reinhard. They took an active role in the executions of Jews at Belzec, Sobibor, Treblinka II, Warsaw (three times), Częstochowa, Lublin, Lwów, Radom, Kraków, Białystok (twice), Majdanek as well as Auschwitz, not to mention Trawniki during Aktion Erntefest of 1943, and the remaining subcamps of KL Lublin including Poniatowa, Budzyn, Kraśnik, Puławy, Lipowa, as well as during massacres in Łomazy, Międzyrzec, Łuków, Radzyń, Parczew, Końskowola, Komarówka and all other locations, augmented by the SS and the Reserve Police Battalion 101 from Orpo. After the war ended, the last 1,000 Hiwis forming the SS Battalion Streibel blended with the civilian population in West Germany and disappeared from sight.

References

General Government
Military history of Germany during World War II
Germany–Poland relations
Military history of Poland during World War II
Military units and formations established in 1940